The 2019 Bucknell Bison football team represents Bucknell University in the 2019 NCAA Division I FCS football season. They are led by first-year head coach Dave Cecchini and play their home games at Christy Mathewson–Memorial Stadium. They play as a member of the Patriot League.

Previous season
The Bison finished the 2018 season 1–10, 1–5 in Patriot League play to finish in last place. In January 2019 the Bucknell Athletics Department announced that Joe Susan would be stepping down as head football coach to serve in a new position within the department. Susan compiled a 38−61 record during his nine-year tenure with the Bison, winning the Patriot League Coach of the Year in 2014. On February 6 it was announced that Dave Cecchini, the former head coach of Valparaiso, would be the 27th Bob Odell Head Football Coach at Bucknell University.

Preseason

Preseason coaches' poll
The Patriot League released their preseason coaches' poll on July 30, 2019 (voting was by conference head coaches and sports information directors). The Bison were picked to finish in seventh (last) place.

Preseason All-Patriot League team
The Bison had two players selected to the preseason All-Patriot League team.

Defense

Simeon Page – LB

Special teams

Alex Pechin – P

Schedule

Source:

Game summaries

at Temple

at Sacred Heart

Villanova

Princeton

Holy Cross

at Colgate

at Towson

at Lafayette

Lehigh

Georgetown

at Fordham

References

Bucknell
Bucknell Bison football seasons
Bucknell Bison football